Phosalone is an organophosphate chemical commonly used as an insecticide and acaricide. It is developed by Rhône-Poulenc in France but EU eliminated it from pesticide registration in December 2006.

The median lethal dose of oral exposure in rat is 85 mg/kg and that of dermal is 390 mg/kg.。It is a weak acetylcholinesterase inhibitor. It is taken by not only oral and inhalation but skin and it causes toxic symptoms peculiar to organophosphorus compounds such as miosis, hypersalivation, hyperhidrosis, chest pressure, pulmonary edema and fecal incontinence. It is flammable and decomposes to toxic gases such as phosphorus oxides, sulfur oxides and nitrogen oxides. It is harmful especially to water creatures.

References

External links
 Phosalone Fact Sheet
 EPA Webpage on Phosolone
 

Acetylcholinesterase inhibitors
Organophosphate insecticides
Chloroarenes
Carbamates
Benzoxazoles
Phosphorodithioates
Ethyl esters